Eleutherodactylus blairhedgesi is a species of frog in the family Eleutherodactylidae endemic to Cuba. It is only known from the area near its type locality, Santa Cruz del Norte in the Mayabeque Province. However, within its restricted range, it is common. It is found on limestone rocks and cliffs in coastal open areas. It is threatened by potential habitat loss associated with touristic development and oil extraction.

References

blairhedgesi
Amphibians of Cuba
Endemic fauna of Cuba
Amphibians described in 1997
Taxonomy articles created by Polbot